Kodie Curran (born December 18, 1989) is a Canadian professional ice hockey defenceman currently playing with Metallurg Magnitogorsk of the Kontinental Hockey League (KHL).

Playing career
Before starting his professional career, Curran played five seasons at the University of Calgary.

Undrafted, Curran made his professional debut at the tail end of the 2014–15 season, signing an initial amateur try-out contract with the Hartford Wolf Pack of the American Hockey League.

He agreed to a one-year contract extension with the Wolf Pack for his rookie season in 2015–16, making just 18 appearances for 4 assists in the AHL, while splitting the season with the Greenville Swamp Rabbits in the ECHL.

With limited North American opportunity, Curran embarked on a European career, winning the Danish cup with Esbjerg Energy in the 2016–17 season. The following season he moved to Storhamar Ishockey in Norway. He was named captain of the team in November when Patrick Thoresen transferred to SKA Saint Petersburg. Storhamar won the league and the cup, and Curran was named player of the year.

Curran moved to his third European club, signing an initial one-year contract with Swedish SHL club, Rögle BK on April 13, 2018. He enjoyed instant success in the SHL, continuing his late development curve in posting 37 points in 49 games from the blueline, to be rewarded with a one-year extension.

In the 2019–20 season, Curran backed up his previous season to have a standout year, contributing with 49 points in just 48 games, earning defenseman of the year and SHL MVP honours.

Attracting interest as a free agent in North America, Curran signed his first NHL contract in agreeing to a two-year contract with the Anaheim Ducks on June 1, 2020.

On March 19, 2022, Curran was traded by the Ducks to the Boston Bruins along with Hampus Lindholm in exchange for a first round pick in 2022, a second round pick in 2023, a second round pick in 2024, Urho Vaakanainen and John Moore.

Unable to make the jump to the NHL, Curran resumed his career abroad in the following 2022–23 season, signing a one-year contract with Russian club, Metallurg Magnitogorsk of the KHL, on September 2, 2022.

Career statistics

Awards and honours

References

External links

1989 births
Calgary Canucks players
Canadian expatriate ice hockey players in Sweden
Canadian ice hockey defencemen
Competitors at the 2015 Winter Universiade
Esbjerg Energy players
Greenville Swamp Rabbits players
Hartford Wolf Pack players
Living people
Providence Bruins players
Rögle BK players
San Diego Gulls (AHL) players
Ice hockey people from Calgary
Spruce Grove Saints players
Storhamar Dragons players
Universiade bronze medalists for Canada
Universiade medalists in ice hockey